Paul and the Printing Press is a 1920 novel by the American author Sara Ware Bassett. It was published by Boston, Little, Brown, and Company.

Plot 
In 1920, Paul Cameron is the president at the Burmingham High School. He notes that other schools have a school paper and suggests that one should be created at his own school too. The March Hare is created and Paul and his fellow students work hard to make it a success.

References

External links 
 
 

1920 novels